Mangled Remains is the demo of the Welsh death metal band Desecration

Track listing
"Mangled Remains"
"Systematic Mutilation"
"Festering Innards"
"Crave For Rot"

1993 albums
Desecration (band) albums